Mariya Viacheslavivna Voloshchenko (born 25 July 1989) is a Ukrainian diver.

She was born in Luhansk. She finished sixth with Hanna Pysmenska in the synchronized 3 metre springboard event of the 2008 Olympic Games.

References

1989 births
Living people
Sportspeople from Luhansk
Ukrainian female divers
Divers at the 2008 Summer Olympics
Olympic divers of Ukraine
Universiade medalists in diving
Universiade gold medalists for Ukraine
Medalists at the 2007 Summer Universiade
21st-century Ukrainian women